Lamptrai, or Lamptra (Λάμπτρα, in inscriptions; Λάμπρα, in writers), was the name of two demoi or ancient Attica, Upper Lamptrai (Lamptrai Kathyperthen), and Lower or Maritime Lamptrai (Lamptrai Paraloi). These places were between Anagyrus, Thorae, and Aegilia.

References

Populated places in ancient Attica
Former populated places in Greece
Demoi